Sooryan may refer to:

Sooryan (1982 film), Indian Malayalam film directed by J. Sasikumar
Sooryan (2007 film), Indian Malayalam film directed by V. M. Vinu